The Para-Badminton World Championships is an individual bi-annual event organized by the BWF. The highest ranked para-badminton players compete in six Sport Classes  in five categories. The championships was organized under Para Badminton World Federation (PBWF) before it decided to join with BWF in June 2011.

Previous host cities
The table below gives an overview of all host cities and countries of the Para-Badminton World Championships.

See also
BWF World Championships
Badminton at the Summer Paralympics

References

External links 
BWF: World Championships
BWF Corporate
2017 BWF Para-Badminton World Championships

 
Recurring sporting events established in 1998
Parasports world championships
Para-badminton
Para-Badminton